Zulia Department from 1824 to 1830 was one of the departments of Gran Colombia. It was split from the Venezuela Department.

It encompassed 4 provinces -  Maracaybo/Maracaibo, Coro Province, Mérida Province and Trujillo Province.

Departments of Gran Colombia
1824 establishments in Gran Colombia
1830 disestablishments in Gran Colombia